Samar Yazbek (born 1970 in Jableh, Syria) is a Syrian writer and journalist. She studied Arabic literature at Latakia University. She has written in a wide variety of genres including novels, short stories, film scripts, television dramas, film and TV criticism, and literary narratives. Several of her works have been translated from the Arabic original into other languages.

Biography
In 2010, Yazbek was selected as one of the 39 most promising authors under the age of 40, by Beirut39, a contest organized by the Hay Festival. In 2011, she took part in the popular uprising against the Assad regime, and was forced into exile a few months later. In 2012, she was chosen for the prestigious PEN/Pinter Prize International writer of courage award, in recognition of her book A Woman in the Crossfire: Diaries of the Syrian Revolution. She was also awarded the Swedish Tucholsky Prize and the Dutch Oxfam/PEN prize in the same year. In 2016 Yazbek's literary narrative The Crossing was awarded the French “Best Foreign Book” prize.

Yazbek also participated in the Syrian cultural caravan, which was an artistic and cultural movement led by Syrian artists that started with a project called "Freedom for the Syrian People" and involved a road trip across Europe.

Works
Yazbek has been a prominent voice in support of human rights and more specifically women's rights in Syria. In 2012, she launched Women Now for Development, an NGO based in France that aims at empowering Syrian women economically and socially.

Awards & Distinctions 

 2016    Best Foreign Book award for The crossing (France) 
 2013    PEN-OXFAM Novib award for A Woman in the Crossfire: Diaries of the Syrian Revolution (The Netherlands)
 2012    PEN Tucholsky award for A Woman in the Crossfire: Diaries of the Syrian Revolution (Sweden)
 2012    PEN Pinter award for A Woman in the Crossfire: Diaries of the Syrian Revolution (UK)
 2010    Selected in the Beirut 39, Hay festival selection of outstanding writers under 40 (Beirut)
 2000    UNICEF, Best literary scenario award to “A falling sky” (TV script)

Other publications 

 “Silence”, PEN Atlas, February 2014
 “I write with blind eyes and forty fingers”, Index on censorship (UK), December 2014
 “On two and a half years of massacre in Syria”, SvD (Sweden) & FAZ (Germany), September 2013
 “Syria’s inferno”, Le Nouvel Observateur, bibliobs (France), September 2013
 “The novelist vs. the revolutionary: My own Syrian debate”, Washington Post (USA), September 2013
 “In the shadow of Assad’s bombs”, The New York Times, OpEd (USA), August 2012
 “Two men”, The Guardian (UK), August 2011

References

Syrian novelists
Syrian women short story writers
Syrian short story writers
Syrian journalists
Syrian women journalists
1970 births
Living people
Syrian feminists
Oxfam Novib/PEN Award winners
Syrian dissidents
Syrian Alawites
21st-century Syrian women writers
21st-century Syrian writers